Stelrad is a British-based manufacturer of central heating radiators. Its Elite radiator is the most popular radiator in the United Kingdom.

History 
Founded in 1936 as the Steel Radiators company in Southall, London. It now makes products for central heating systems. It opened a factory in Dalbeattie, Dumfries and Galloway, in 1961, which closed in 1998.

Structure 
It is situated off the A6022 in Swinton, between the railway stations of Swinton and Mexborough. It has a seventeen-acre site.

The R&D site is in Belgium.

Products 
 Radiators – it produces over 2.5 million each year at its factory in South Yorkshire on four manufacturing lines, which operate twenty four hours a day, five days a week. Every radiator is Kitemarked under BS 442.

References

External links 
 Stelrad

Companies based in Rotherham
Manufacturing companies established in 1936
Heating, ventilation, and air conditioning companies
Engineering companies of the United Kingdom
Residential heating appliances
1936 establishments in England
Manufacturing companies based in London
Companies listed on the London Stock Exchange